Carl Mundt may refer to:

 Carl Emil Mundt (1802–1873), Danish educator and politician
 Karl E. Mundt (1900–1974), American politician

See also
 Carl Georg Munters (1897–1989), Swedish inventor